Hesperoperla is a genus of common stoneflies in the family Perlidae. There are at least two described species in Hesperoperla.

Species
These two species belong to the genus Hesperoperla:
 Hesperoperla hoguei Baumann & Stark, 1980 (banded stone)
 Hesperoperla pacifica (Banks, 1900) (golden stonefly)

References

Further reading

 
 

Perlidae
Articles created by Qbugbot